Task switching may refer to:

 Context switching in computing
 Task switching (psychology) in psychology